DTWD1, DTW domain containing 1, is a human gene. The domain contains multiple conserved motifs including a DTXW motif that this domain has been named.

References